The PCB Women's Twenty20 Tournament, previously the National Triangular T20 Women's Cricket Championship, is a women's domestic Twenty20 competition organised by the Pakistan Cricket Board. The tournament first took place in 2019–20, with three teams taking part: PCB Blasters, PCB Challengers and PCB Dynamites. The tournament expanded to four teams in 2022–23, with the addition of PCB Strikers. The competition has run alongside the PCB Triangular One Day Women's Tournament.

PCB Challengers won the first two editions of the competition, beating PCB Blasters in the final in 2019–20 and PCB Dynamites in the final in 2020–21. PCB Blasters won their first title in 2022–23, beating PCB Dynamites in the final.

History
The PCB Triangular Twenty20 Women's Tournament was established in 2019–20, effectively replacing the Departmental T20 Women's Championship. Three teams, PCB Blasters, PCB Challengers and PCB Dynamites, made up of the best players from across Pakistan, competed in a round-robin group across a week in January 2020 at the National Stadium, Karachi. PCB Challengers won the tournament, beating PCB Blasters by 6 wickets in the final, helped by an unbeaten half-century from captain Bismah Maroof.

In 2020–21 the tournament took place behind closed doors (due to the COVID-19 pandemic) at the Rawalpindi Cricket Stadium in November and December 2020. PCB Challengers again won the competition, beating PCB Dynamites in the final by 7 runs.

In 2022–23 the tournament expanded to four teams, with the addition of PCB Strikers, who formed ahead of the 2021–22 Pakistan Women's One Day Cup. The tournament was preceded by a "first phase", with three teams, PCB Conquerors, PCB Invincibles and PCB Stars, made up of Under-19 and emerging players (with the tournament taking place at the same time as the national side's series against Ireland). The first phase tournament was won by PCB Stars. The second phase of the tournament is taking place from 1 to 9 December 2022. In the second phase competition, PCB Blasters and PCB Dynamites qualified for the final, with PCB Blasters emerging victorious by 7 runs.

Teams

Results

See also
 Pakistan Women's One Day Cup
 National T20 Cup

References

Pakistani domestic cricket competitions
Women's cricket competitions in Pakistan
Recurring sporting events established in 2020
2020 establishments in Pakistan
Twenty20 cricket leagues